Jamie Franks (born September 25, 1986 in Medford, New Jersey) is an American soccer player who last played for Rochester Rhinos in the USSF Division 2 Professional League. He is currently the head coach for the University of Denver. Franks is one of four brothers; Ryan, Brad, and Kyle.

Career

Youth and College
Franks attended Shawnee High School, where he was the 2004 New Jersey High School Player of the Year, a NSCAA/adidas High School All-American and a two-time NSCAA/adidas Youth All-American, and played club soccer for Medford Speed and the PDA Conquistadors.

He played college soccer at Wake Forest University from 2005 to 2008, appearing in 93 games for them in this period. In his senior year he had 3 goals and 11 assists.  He compiled 7 goals and 20 assists over his four years, appeared in three college cups and won the 2007 National Championship.

During his college years Franks also played for both the Ocean City Barons and Carolina Dynamo in the USL Premier Development League.

Professional
Franks was drafted in the fourth round (49th overall) of the 2009 MLS SuperDraft by Chivas USA, but was not offered a contract by the club, and eventually signed with the Wilmington Hammerheads of the USL Second Division. He made his professional debut on April 25, 2009 in Wilmington's 2–2 opening day tie with the Charlotte Eagles.

He moved to USSF Division 2 club Rochester Rhinos in March 2010.

Franks joined the coaching staff at his alma mater, Wake Forest, in March 2011.

Coaching 

It was announced on March 21, 2012 that Franks would be leaving Wake Forest to become an assistant coach at the University of Denver.

On January 30, 2015 it was announced that Franks was the new head coach of the Denver Pioneers men's soccer team.

After a successful 2016 season which saw the Pioneers reach their first ever College Cup, Franks won the NSCAA College Coach of the Year. The Pioneers finished third in the final NSCAA rankings and posted a 20–1–3 record.

International
While in college Franks played for the USA Under-18s national team.

Honors

Player 
Rochester Rhinos
 USSF Division 2 Pro League Regular Season Champions: 2010

Wilmington Hammerheads
 USL Second Division Regular Season Champions: 2009

Wake Forest University
 NCAA Men's Division I Soccer Championship: 2007

Coach 
NSCAA College Coach of the Year: 2016

References

External links
Wilmington Hammerheads bio
Wake Forest bio

1986 births
Living people
People from Medford, New Jersey
Shawnee High School (New Jersey) alumni
Soccer players from New Jersey
Sportspeople from Burlington County, New Jersey
North Carolina Fusion U23 players
Ocean City Nor'easters players
Wilmington Hammerheads FC players
Charleston Battery players
Rochester New York FC players
USL League Two players
USL Second Division players
USL First Division players
USSF Division 2 Professional League players
American soccer players
Parade High School All-Americans (boys' soccer)
Wake Forest Demon Deacons men's soccer coaches
Wake Forest Demon Deacons men's soccer players
Denver Pioneers men's soccer coaches
Chivas USA draft picks
Association football midfielders
American soccer coaches